Lesotho sent a delegation to compete at the 2008 Summer Paralympics in Beijing, People's Republic of China. According to official records, the country's only athlete was female runner Thato Mohasoa.

Athletics

Women

See also
Lesotho at the Paralympics
Lesotho at the 2008 Summer Olympics

External links
International Paralympic Committee

References

Nations at the 2008 Summer Paralympics
2008
Summer Paralympics